Coenzyme gamma-F420-2:α-L-glutamate ligase (MJ1001, CofF protein, gamma-F420-2:alpha-L-glutamate ligase) is an enzyme with systematic name L-glutamate:coenzyme gamma-F420-2 (ADP-forming). This enzyme catalyses the following chemical reaction

 ATP + coenzyme γ-F420-2 + L-glutamate   ADP + phosphate + coenzyme α-F420-3

The enzyme caps the γ-glutamyl tail of the hydride carrier [[coenzyme F420]].

References

External links 
 

EC 6.3.2